The men's freestyle light heavyweight competition at the 1952 Summer Olympics in Helsinki took place from 20 July to 23 July at Messuhalli. Nations were limited to one competitor.

Competition format
This freestyle wrestling competition continued to use the "bad points" elimination system introduced at the 1928 Summer Olympics for Greco-Roman and at the 1932 Summer Olympics for freestyle wrestling, removing the slight modification introduced in 1936 and used until 1948 (which had a reduced penalty for a loss by 2–1 decision). Each round featured all wrestlers pairing off and wrestling one bout (with one wrestler having a bye if there were an odd number). The loser received 3 points. The winner received 1 point if the win was by decision and 0 points if the win was by fall. At the end of each round, any wrestler with at least 5 points was eliminated. This elimination continued until the medal rounds, which began when 3 wrestlers remained. These 3 wrestlers each faced each other in a round-robin medal round (with earlier results counting, if any had wrestled another before); record within the medal round determined medals, with bad points breaking ties.

Results

Round 1

 Bouts

 Points

Round 2

Lardon withdrew after his bout.

 Bouts

 Points

Round 3

 Bouts

 Points

Round 4

 Bouts

 Points

Round 5

 Bouts

 Points

Medal rounds

Palm's victory over Wittenberg in round 3 and Wittenberg's victory over Atan in round 5 counted for the medal round. The only bout left for the round therefore was Palm against Atan, with Wittenberg a spectator—who had to hope for an Atan victory to create a three-way tie at 1–1 which Wittenberg would win on bad points to take gold. Palm was able to defeat Atan in a split decision, however, and the Swede thereby won the gold medal, having beaten both of the other medalists. 

 Bouts

 Points

References

Wrestling at the 1952 Summer Olympics